Deterioration may refer to:

 Worsening of health
 Physical wear

See also
 Decadence (disambiguation)
 Degeneracy (disambiguation)
 Deteriorata, a parody of Desiderata
 Decay
 Decline